This is a listing of the horses that finished in either first, second, or third place and the number of starters in the John B. Campbell Handicap, an American stakes race for horses three years old and older at 1-1/8 miles (9 furlongs) on the dirt held at Laurel Park Racecourse in Laurel, Maryland.  (List 1954-present)

A # designates that the race was run in two divisions in 1973, 1972 and 1970.

References

External links
 The John B. Campbell Handicap at Pedigree Query

Laurel Park Racecourse